Loliondo  Airstrip  is an airstrip serving the village of Loliondo, in the Arusha Region of Tanzania.

See also

List of airports in Tanzania
Transport in Tanzania

References

External links
Tanzania Airports Authority
OurAirports - Loliondo
OpenStreetMap - Loliondo
 

Airstrips in Tanzania
Buildings and structures in the Arusha Region